The Ivy Bowl (also known as the Epson Ivy Bowl) was an international college football game played between an American, 43-man all-star team (composed of only Ivy League players) versus a team of college all-stars from Japan. The first Epson Ivy Bowl occurred on January 8, 1989, and the final game occurred at the conclusion of the 1996 NCAA Division I-AA football season. The United States won every match-up. The wins, because they were not between two NCAA-affiliated schools and some of the years were mixed school (all-star) teams do not count toward official win–loss records.

Despite the fact that the College of William & Mary was not a member of the Ivy League, they were chosen to participate in 1988 and 1992 seasons' Epson Ivy Bowls.  Long considered a "public ivy", William & Mary was the only true non-Ivy League school to send players to Japan.

Game results

Game participants

1989

Ivy League All-Stars

Coaches
Maxie Baughan - Head Coach
Johnny Unitas
Pete Retzlaff
Mark Baughan

Japan All-Stars

Kuniaki Miura
Ryota Watanabe
Kenichi Kotani
Shoji Sagawa
Kenji Kato
Kenji Udagawa
Naritoshi Shibata
Hiroyiki Takeda
Kazuhiko Yamaguchi
Naoji Matsuzaki
Juichi Suzuki
Kimihiro Tsuchiya
Satoshi Iwata
Seiji Funakoshi
Yoshiki Hayami
Minoru Hayashi
Ryusei Kajiyama
Hiroyuki Masuda
Seigo Arimatsu
Hajime Kobayashi
Tetsuya Sadai
Masaki Ogawa
Kenji Suzuki
Toshihiko Yamaguchi
Yoshihito Itakura
Satoki Kato
Noriyuki Oshima
Shigeo Yokata
Tetsuro Kawano
Kazunori Jinbo
Takanori Nozawa
Hirotaka Nanba
Minoru Shiota
Yoshihiro Iizuka
Akira Imai
Takayuki Ota
Yoshinao Sugawara
Masakazu Terashima
Yuzo Ichijo
Kei Nishiyama
Manabu Kamoshida
Katsuhiko Togo
Makoto Ishii
Nachi Abe
Yasutomo Motohashi
Atsushi Oyori
Hiroshi Kashiwagi
Toshihiro Moritomo
Kichi Nishiyama
Tomohiro Yanase
Kazuho Suzuki
Kenichiro Imada
Masaaki Kitami
Yuichi Shintaku
Tsutomu Kusakabe
Ryuta Tatsumi
Maki Yoshida
Tomohiro Tsuruta
Hiroshi Fujii
Motohide Takano
Yasuhiro Kishimoto
Koji Owada
Masaichiro Kanamoto
Tadashi Kaneko
Takuya Otsuki
Nobuharu Kondo
Shinichi Yokote
Koji Suzuki
Sojiro Harada
Kenichi Fujiwara
Toshiei Seki
Yosei Maeno
Takao Asakura
Takuya Iwasaki
Atsuya Yoshizawa
Shunji Mori
Jun Simizu
Shinji Maehara
Iwao Yoshino
Toshikazu Iino
Kinya Shibayama

See also
List of college bowl games

References

Recurring events disestablished in 1996
Defunct college football bowls
Ivy League football
Penn Quakers football
Recurring sporting events established in 1989
William & Mary Tribe football bowl games
American football in Japan
1989 establishments in Japan
1996 disestablishments in Japan